Stizocephalus is a genus of dirt-colored seed bugs in the family Rhyparochromidae. There are about seven described species in Stizocephalus.

Species
These seven species belong to the genus Stizocephalus:
 Stizocephalus atratus Scudder, 1975
 Stizocephalus brevirostris Eyles, 1970
 Stizocephalus explanatus Scudder, 1975
 Stizocephalus fuscus Scudder, 1975
 Stizocephalus hirsutus Scudder, 1975
 Stizocephalus pilosus Scudder, 1975
 Stizocephalus tuberculatus Scudder, 1975

References

External links

 

Rhyparochromidae